The Citroën C4 WRC is a World Rally Car built for the Citroën World Rally Team by Citroën Racing to compete in the World Rally Championship. It is based upon the Citroën C4 road car and replaced the Citroën Xsara WRC. The car was introduced for the 2007 World Rally Championship season and has taken the drivers' title each year since in the hands of Sébastien Loeb, as well as the manufacturers' title in 2008, 2009 and 2010.

The C4 WRC and Loeb maintained a 100% record on asphalt events during its WRC career, winning all 13 pure asphalt rounds of the World Rally Championship.

Competition history

2007
The car made its debut at the 2007 Monte Carlo Rally in the hands of Citroën World Rally Team drivers Sébastien Loeb and Daniel Sordo. Loeb won the rally after leading throughout, with Sordo finishing as runner-up, with the pair winning the first nine of 15 stages. Loeb went on to win seven of the remaining 15 rallies that season to beat Ford's Marcus Grönholm to the title by nine points. Sordo finished fourth in the standings.

2008
Citroën retained Loeb and Sordo in their team for 2008, with Loeb winning 11 out of 15 rallies to take the title, while Sordo finished third in the standings. This was enough for Citroën to regain the manufacturers' crown.

C4 WRCs were also run by privateer squad PH-Sport for Conrad Rautenbach and Urmo Aava during the season, as well as for Junior World Rally Championship winner Sébastien Ogier at the final event of the season, Rally GB. Ogier lead the event early on despite it being his first in a WRC car.

2009
In 2009, Loeb and Sordo once again drove for the factory squad, with Loeb winning the first five events of the year and then winning the final two to beat Ford driver Mikko Hirvonen to the title by just one point. Sordo finished a solid third as Citroën retained the manufacturers' title.

PH-Sport ran a second team of C4 WRCs under the Citroën Junior Team banner for Rautenbach and Ogier, with Evgeny Novikov, Chris Atkinson and Aaron Burkart also appearing under the banner during the year. Petter Solberg ran an old Xsara WRC for his own team for most of the season, before switching to a C4 WRC for the penultimate round, and was then entered under the Junior Team banner for the final round of the season.

2010
Loeb and Sordo continued with the factory team into 2010, while the Junior Team ran Ogier and Kimi Räikkönen. Ogier, though, had a strong start to the season (including a win in Portugal) and so was swapped with Sordo for gravel rounds in the second half of the season. Ogier then won the 2010 Rally Japan as a factory driver.

Petter Solberg drove a C4 WRC for his own team and picked up eight podiums over the season, finishing third in the final standings, behind of work's drivers Ogier and Sordo.

WRC victories

{|class="wikitable" style="font-size: 95%; "
! No.
! Event
! Season
! Driver
! Co-driver
|-
| 1
|  2007 Monte Carlo Rally
| 2007
|  Sébastien Loeb
|  Daniel Elena
|-
| 2
|  2007 Rally Mexico
| 2007
|  Sébastien Loeb
|  Daniel Elena
|-
| 3
|  2007 Rally de Portugal
| 2007
|  Sébastien Loeb
|  Daniel Elena
|-
| 4
|  2007 Rally Argentina
| 2007
|  Sébastien Loeb
|  Daniel Elena
|-
| 5
|  2007 Rallye Deutschland
| 2007
|  Sébastien Loeb
|  Daniel Elena
|-
| 6
|  2007 Rally Catalunya
| 2007
|  Sébastien Loeb
|  Daniel Elena
|-
| 7
|  2007 Tour de Corse
| 2007
|  Sébastien Loeb
|  Daniel Elena
|-
| 8
|  2007 Rally Ireland
| 2007
|  Sébastien Loeb
|  Daniel Elena
|-
| 9
|  2008 Monte Carlo Rally
| 2008
|  Sébastien Loeb
|  Daniel Elena
|-
| 10
|  2008 Rally Mexico
| 2008
|  Sébastien Loeb
|  Daniel Elena
|-
| 11
|  2008 Rally Argentina
| 2008
|  Sébastien Loeb
|  Daniel Elena
|-
| 12
|  2008 Rally d'Italia Sardegna
| 2008
|  Sébastien Loeb
|  Daniel Elena
|-
| 13
|  2008 Acropolis Rally
| 2008
|  Sébastien Loeb
|  Daniel Elena
|-
| 14
|  2008 Rally Finland
| 2008
|  Sébastien Loeb
|  Daniel Elena
|-
| 15
|  2008 Rallye Deutschland
| 2008
|  Sébastien Loeb
|  Daniel Elena
|-
| 16
|  2008 Rally New Zealand
| 2008
|  Sébastien Loeb
|  Daniel Elena
|-
| 17
|  2008 Rally Catalunya
| 2008
|  Sébastien Loeb
|  Daniel Elena
|-
| 18
|  2008 Tour de Corse
| 2008
|  Sébastien Loeb
|  Daniel Elena
|-
| 19
|  2008 Wales Rally GB
| 2008
|  Sébastien Loeb
|  Daniel Elena
|-
| 20
|  2009 Rally Ireland
| 2009
|  Sébastien Loeb
|  Daniel Elena
|-
| 21
|  2009 Rally Norway
| 2009
|  Sébastien Loeb
|  Daniel Elena
|-
| 22
|  2009 Cyprus Rally
| 2009
|  Sébastien Loeb
|  Daniel Elena
|-
| 23
|  2009 Rally de Portugal
| 2009
|  Sébastien Loeb
|  Daniel Elena
|-
| 24
|  2009 Rally Argentina
| 2009
|  Sébastien Loeb
|  Daniel Elena
|-
| 25
|  2009 Rally Catalunya
| 2009
|  Sébastien Loeb
|  Daniel Elena
|-
| 26
|  2009 Rally GB
| 2009
|  Sébastien Loeb
|  Daniel Elena
|-
| 27
|  2010 Rally Mexico
| 2010
|  Sébastien Loeb
|  Daniel Elena
|-
| 28
|  2010 Jordan Rally
| 2010
|  Sébastien Loeb
|  Daniel Elena
|-
| 29
|  2010 Rally of Turkey
| 2010
|  Sébastien Loeb
|  Daniel Elena
|-
| 30
|  2010 Rally de Portugal
| 2010
|  Sébastien Ogier
|  Julien Ingrassia
|-
| 31
|  2010 Rally Bulgaria
| 2010
|  Sébastien Loeb
|  Daniel Elena
|-
| 32
|  2010 Rallye Deutschland
| 2010
|  Sébastien Loeb
|  Daniel Elena
|-
| 33
|  2010 Rally Japan
| 2010
|  Sébastien Ogier
|  Julien Ingrassia
|-
| 34
|  2010 Rallye de France
| 2010
|  Sébastien Loeb
|  Daniel Elena
|-
| 35
|  2010 Rally Catalunya
| 2010
|  Sébastien Loeb
|  Daniel Elena
|-
| 36
|  2010 Wales Rally GB
| 2010
|  Sébastien Loeb
|  Daniel Elena
|}

Gallery

References

World Rally Cars
C4 WRC
All-wheel-drive vehicles
World Rally championship-winning cars